The 2012 Cheltenham Gold Cup (known as the Betfred Gold Cup for sponsorship reasons) was the 84th annual running of the Cheltenham Gold Cup horse race held at Cheltenham Racecourse on 16 March 2012.

Fourteen horses ran and the steeplechase was won by 8/1 shot Synchronised, who was trained by Jonjo O'Neill and ridden by Tony McCoy. Synchronised completed the course in a time of 6 minutes 36.19 seconds and won by a distance of 2¼ lengths from second-placed The Giant Bolster.

Kauto Star was attempting to win the Gold Cup for the third time and made a prominent start, but was weakened by a poor jump at the eighth fence and pulled-up by jockey Ruby Walsh before the tenth of the 22 fences.

The Gold Cup was sponsored by Betfred for the first time. Betfred had purchased The Tote, sponsors of the race since 1980, in June 2011.

Details
 Sponsor: Betfred
 Winner's prize money: £284,750
 Going: Good, good to soft in places
 Number of runners: 14
 Winner's time: 6 mins 36.19 secs

Full result

Fourteen ran in the race; the Irish-trained Quel Esprit made the card but did not run. Ten completed the course, three were pulled-up by their jockeys during the race, and one, What A Friend, fell at the second fence.

 Amateur jockeys indicated by "Mr".
† Trainers are based in Great Britain unless indicated.

Winner's details
Further details of the winner, Synchronised, ridden by jockey Tony McCoy:

 Foaled: 7 March 2003, in Ireland
 Sire: Sadler's Wells; Dam: Mayasta
 Trainer: Jonjo O'Neill
 Owner: J. P. McManus
 Breeder: Mrs. Noreen McManus

See also
Horseracing in Great Britain
List of British National Hunt races
2012 Grand National

References

Cheltenham Gold Cup
 2012
Cheltenham Gold Cup
Cheltenham Gold Cup
2010s in Gloucestershire